Midas is the name of two fictional characters appearing in American comic books published by Marvel Comics.

Publication history
The Mordecai Midas version of Midas first appeared in Iron Man #17 and was created by Archie Goodwin and George Tuska.

The Malcolm J. Meriwell version of Midas first appeared in Marvel Team-Up #30 and was created by Gerry Conway and Jim Mooney.

Fictional character biography

Mordecai Midas

Mordecai Midas was born in Athens, Greece, and was once a starving child in Europe. He became a billionaire business magnate, determined to become the richest man by any means possible.

Midas rescued Whitney Frost from a sinking ship, gave her a golden mask to hide her scarred features, and she became his assistant. Midas sent Whitney, as Madame Masque, to sabotage Stark Industries, hoping to kill Stark (and his alter ego, Iron Man) and receive the business after Tony's cousin Morgan Stark inherited it. Midas captured Iron Man, but Madam Masque fell in love with Stark and freed him. Iron Man and Midas fought, and in the conflict Midas' chair was damaged, resulting in an explosion that destroyed Midas' base.

Much later, Midas took control of Stark International. He battled Iron Man, Madame Masque, the Guardsman, the Jack of Hearts, Eddie March, the Wraith, Jasper Sitwell, and Jean DeWolff. Midas learned Iron Man's secret identity, but was reduced to a mindless husk by the mental powers of Marianne Rodgers. He became a patient in a psychiatric hospital on full life support.

Years later, Iron Man returned to Greece to investigate the death of a private investigator who had been hired to find out who had been stealing gold shipments bound for Stark Enterprises. Iron Man came across an undersea base containing Midas' Centurions. Midas joined the battle, having been turned into a living being of gold as an after-effect of his powers being turned inward by Marianne Rodgers' psi-powers. Midas tried to escape on a vehicle piloted by one of his Centurions after Iron Man defeated him. His weight and the supply of gold he had proved too much, causing him to be accidentally thrown overboard. Iron Man searched the ocean bottoms for him, but could not find him. As Midas tried to grab Iron Man, his electrode shorted out, causing Midas to sink into the mire.

As Tony Stark announced the formation of Stark Solutions, Midas was among Iron Man's archenemies who vowed revenge.

Malcolm J. Meriwell

Malcolm J. Meriwell became convinced that his wealthy philanthropist brother Harrison was being tricked by charities and tries to persuade him to cease his spending activities. When Harrison refused, Malcolm became insanely determined to halt his brother's activities. Donning the alias of Midas the Golden Man and working out of Harrison's discothèque the Hot Spot, Malcolm started to get some inner circle kids to be addicted to his drugs in a plot to wipe out all blacks in America. This did attract the attention of Sam Wilson and Glory Grant. Glory Grant's cousin and his friends were drugged by Midas' henchmen and they ended up assaulting Glory. Her cries attracted the attention of Spider-Man, who subdued them. When the drugs wore off, they remembered a golden man and his plot. When Glory Grant alerted Sam Wilson, he entered the Hot Spot as the Falcon at the same time when Spider-Man arrived and they confront Midas and his thugs. They defeated the thugs, but Midas escaped. Heading over to Malcolm's estate, Spider-Man and the Falcon are ambushed by Midas' thugs, who knocked them out and bounded them in metal straps. Midas traps them in a rapidly freezing room, but Spider-Man uses his webbing to free himself and the Falcon. After being freed by Midas' employees and encountering the brothers, Spider-Man and the Falcon identify Malcolm as Midas. Spider-Man and the Falcon easily subdue Malcolm by pulling the rug out from underneath him and sending Malcolm out the window.

Powers and abilities
Midas I dresses in the clothing of ancient Greece, and supports his enormous weight by wearing a powered exoskeleton built by Midas's scientists, enabling Midas to walk. He rides a special throne-shaped hovercraft containing various weaponry and devices, including two telescoping mechanical arms, a heat-seeking antenna, two small anti-personnel missiles, and a dozen high intensity shock blasters, and whose base delivers an electric shock to anyone touching it; the throne moves on a field of compressed air like a hydrofoil craft. Midas wears powered glove units developed by Abraham Klein, giving him the "golden touch" that allows him the ability to permanently paralyze a person's nervous system while accompanied by a spray of rapidly hardening liquid gold, giving the victim's skin a golden color; the gloves also give him the ability to fire either electrical blasts or the "golden touch" effect from his hands over short distances. Midas also has access to the Flying Fortress, a gigantic hovercraft headquarters resembling an ancient Greek city, and a supersonic aircraft squadron armed with "lightning simulator" weapons, which fire powerful electrical bolts. Midas possesses a genius intellect, and is a master strategist and tactician, and a skilled businessman. He is entirely self-educated, equivalent to college level, especially in economics and business administration. After being struck by Marianne Rodgers' mindblast, his golden touch power was turned inward, transforming Midas into a being of living gold. In his golden form, Midas does not need to eat or sleep, but can absorb gold into him.

Midas II carried a special drug spray that he used to get his victims addicted to his drugs.

References

External links
 
 

Characters created by Archie Goodwin (comics)
Characters created by George Tuska
Characters created by Gerry Conway
Comics characters introduced in 1969
Comics characters introduced in 1975
Fictional businesspeople
Fictional drug dealers
Fictional Greek people
Marvel Comics supervillains